The Constitution of Medina (Dustūr al-Madīna), also known as the Charter of Medina (Ṣaḥīfat al-Madīnah; or: , Mīthāq al-Madina "Covenant of Medina"), is the modern name given to a document believed to have been written in 622-624 CE. However, no copy of the document has ever been found, and there are many mentions of the existence of such document in the early history of Islam.

The traditional Islamic narrative about this document is as follows: It was drawn up on behalf of the Islamic prophet Muhammad shortly after he arrived at Medina (then known as Yathrib) in 622 CE (or 1 AH), following the Hijra from Mecca.

The preamble declares the document to be "a book [kitab] of the prophet Muhammad to operate between the believers [mu'minin] and Muslims from the Quraysh tribe and from Yathrib and those who may be under them and wage war in their company" declaring them to constitute "one community [ummah wāḥidah] separate from all other people". It established the collective responsibility of nine constituent tribes for their members' actions, specifically emphasising blood money and ransom payment. The first constituent group mentioned are the Qurayshi migrants, followed by eight other tribes. Eight Jewish groups are recognized as part of the Yathrib community, and their religious separation from Muslims is established. The Jewish Banu Shutayba tribe is inserted as one of the Jewish groups, rather than with the nine tribes mentioned earlier in the document. The constitution also established Muhammad as the mediating authority between groups and forbids the waging of war without his authorization.

The constitution formed the basis of a multi-religious Islamic state in Medina.

The constitution was created to end the bitter intertribal fighting between the rival clans of Banu Aws and Banu Khazraj in Medina and to maintain peace and co-operation among all Medinan groups. Establishing the role of Muhammad as the mediating authority between the two groups and the others in Medina was central to the ending of Medinan internal violence and was an essential feature of the constitution. The document ensured freedom of religious beliefs and practices for all citizens who "follow the believers". It assured that representatives of all parties, Muslim or non-Muslim, should be present when consultation occurs or in cases of negotiation with foreign states. It declared "a woman can only be hosted by a host with the consent of her family" and imposed a tax system for supporting the community in times of conflict. It declared the role of Medina as a ḥaram ("sanctuary"), where no blood of the peoples included in the pact can be spilled.

The division of the constitution into numbered articles would not have been in the original text but was added much later by scholars. Therefore, the numbering of clauses differs across different versions. But there is general agreement on the authenticity of the most widely-read version of the charter, which is found in Ibn Hisham's sira.

Background
According to traditional Islamic belief, in Muhammad's last years in Mecca, a delegation from Medina from its twelve important clans invited him as a neutral outsider to serve as the chief arbitrator for the entire community. There had been fighting in Medina involving mainly its pagan and Jewish inhabitants for around 100 years before 620. The recurring slaughters and disagreements over the resulting claims, especially after the Battle of Bu'ath in which all the clans had been involved, made it obvious to them that the tribal conceptions of blood feud and an eye for an eye were no longer workable unless there was one man with the authority to adjudicate in disputed cases. The delegation from Medina pledged themselves and their fellow citizens to accept Muhammad into their community and to protect him physically as if he was one of them.

After emigration to Medina, Muhammad drafted the constitution, "establishing a kind of alliance or federation" of the eight Medinan tribes and Muslim emigrants from Mecca and specifying the rights and duties of all citizens and the relationship of the different communities in Medina, including that of the Muslim community to other communities: the Jews and the other "Peoples of the Book". According to chroniclers such as Ibn Sa'd al-Baghdadi, the composition of the population of Medina at that time consisted of two supergroup local Arab tribes, the Aus and the Khazraj, with eight clans and 33 other smaller groups under them. Meanwhile, the Jewish tribes at least consisted of around 20 groups, with the most well-known tribes Qaynuqa, Nadhir, and Qurayza among them.

Historical sources
No copy of the Constitution of Medina has ever been found. We only know of its existence from excerpts included in early Muslim sources, the earliest of which is "Al-Sīrah Al-Nabawiyyah" of Ibn Hisham (early 800s CE), which claims to republish material found in the lost "Sīrat Rasūl Allāh" of Ibn Ishaq (mid 700s CE). Later Muslim writings, such as those by Sayyid al-Nas and Abu ‘Ubayd's Kitab al-Amwal also claim to preserve material from the Constitution of Medina. 
The document's historicity has been questioned, such as by the revisionist scholars, though many Muslim and Western scholars of Islam believe such a document did exist during the time of Muhammad—but that it did not survive and we cannot be certain of its contents.

One 20th-century scholar, Montgomery Watt, suggested that the Constitution of Medina must have been written in the early Medinan period (i.e., in 622 CE or shortly thereafter), because if the document been drafted any later, then it would have both had a positive attitude towards the Quraysh and given Muhammad a prominent place. Others, such as Hubert Grimme, suggested that it must have been drafted after the 624 CE Battle of Badr. Still others, such as Leone Caetani, suggested that the document was written before that battle.

Another mid-20th century scholar, RB Serjeant, proposed that 3:101–104 of the Qur'an may refer to the Constitution of Medina. He hypothesized that the document underwent recension: In its first recension, the text sanctioned the establishment of a confederation; in its second, it admonished the Aws and Khazraj to abide by their treaty; in its third, in conjunction with the proceeding verses, it is an encouragement of Muhammad's adherents to face the Meccan forces they eventually fought at Uhud.

Original text
The following is a translation into English of what was alleged (by Ibn Hisham in the early 800s CE) to have been the text of the Constitution of Medina by Muslim scholar Muhamad Hamidullah based on the following sources: the Seerah of Ibn Hisham which quotes the Seerah of Ibn Ishaq, Abu Ubaid's Kitab-al-Amwal, and Ibn Kathir's al-Bidayah-wan-Nihaya. A comparative translation of the two versions by Ibn Ishaq in Ibn Hisham's recension and Abu Ubaid has been published by Michael Lecker, who highlights the differences between the two texts.A Translation of the Constitution of the City-State of Madina in the Time of the Prophet (صلى الله عليه وسلم)

[I have tried to make the translation very clear so as not to require any marginal notes for its understanding. The clauses have been numbered, to facilitate easy reference. Since this numbering has been agreed upon and is the same in Germany, Holland, Italy, and other places, so whenever I have had to differ I have indicated my difference by subdividing the clause into (a), (b), etc., so as not to interfere with the international numbering.]

In the name of God, the Beneficent and the Merciful

(1) This is a prescript of Muhammad (صلى الله عليه وسلم), the Prophet and Messenger of God (to operate) between the faithful and the followers of Islam from among the Quraish and the people of Madina and those who may be under them, may join them and take part in wars in their company.

(2) They shall constitute a separate political unit (Ummat) as distinguished from all the people (of the world).

(3) The emigrants from the Quraish shall be (responsible) for own their ward; and shall pay their blood money in mutual collaboration and shall secure the release of their own prisoners by paying their ransom from themselves so that the mutual dealings between the believers be in accordance with the principles of goodness and justice.

(4) And Banu ‘Awf shall be responsible for their own ward and shall pay their blood money in mutual collaboration, and every group shall secure the release of its own prisoners by paying their ransom from themselves so that the dealings between the believers be in accordance with the principles of goodness and justice.

(5) And Banu Al-Harith-ibn-Khazraj shall be responsible for their own ward and shall pay their blood-money in mutual collaboration and every group shall secure the release of its own prisoners by paying their ransom from themselves, so that the dealings between the believers be in accordance with the principles of goodness and justice.

(6) And Banu Sa‘ida shall be responsible for their own ward, and shall pay their blood-money in mutual collaboration and every group shall secure the release of its own prisoners by paying their ransom from themselves, so that the dealings between the believers be in accordance with the principles of goodness and justice.

(7) And Banu Jusham shall be responsible for their own ward and shall pay their blood-money in mutual collaboration and every group shall secure the release of its own prisoners by paying their ransom so that the dealings between the believers be in accordance with the principles of goodness and justice.

(8) And Banu an-Najjar shall be responsible for their own ward and shall pay their blood-money in mutual collaboration and every group shall secure the release of its own prisoners by paying their ransom so that the dealings between the believers be in accordance with the principles of goodness and justice.

(9) And Banu ‘Amr-ibn-‘Awf shall be responsible for their own ward and shall pay their blood-money in mutual collaboration and every group shall secure the release of its own prisoners by paying their ransom, so that the dealings between the believers be in accordance with the principles of goodness and justice.

(10) And Banu-al-Nabit shall be responsible for their own ward and shall pay their blood-money in mutual collaboration and every group shall secure the release of its own prisoners by paying their ransom so that the dealings between the believers be in accordance with the principles of goodness and justice.

(11) And Banu-al-Aws shall be responsible for their own ward and shall pay their blood-money in mutual collaboration and every group shall secure the release of its own prisoners by paying their ransom, so that the dealings between the believers be in accordance with the principles of goodness and justice.

(12) (a) And the believers shall not leave any one, hard-pressed with debts, without affording him some relief, in order that the dealings between the believers be in accordance with the principles of goodness and justice. (b) Also no believer shall enter into a contract of clientage with one who is already in such a contract with another believer.

(13) And the hands of pious believers shall be raised against every such person as rises in rebellion or attempts to acquire anything by force or is guilty of any sin or excess or attempts to spread mischief among the believers ; their hands shall be raised all together against such a person, even if he be a son to any one of them.

(14)  A Believer will not kill a Believer [in retaliation] for a non-Believer and will not aid a non-Believer against a Believer.

(15) The protection (dhimmah) of Allah is one, the least of them [i.e., the Believers] is entitled to grant protection (yujīr) that is binding for all of them. The Believers are each other’s allies (mawālī) to the exclusion of other people.

(16) And that those who will obey us among the Jews, will have help and equality. Neither shall they be oppressed nor will any help be given against them.

(17) And the peace of the believers shall be one. If there be any war in the way of God, no believer shall be under any peace (with the enemy) apart from other believers, unless it (this peace) be the same and equally binding on all.

(18) And all those detachments that will fight on our side will be relieved by turns.

(19) And the believers as a body shall take blood vengeance in the way of God.

(20) (a) And undoubtedly pious believers are the best and in the rightest course. (b) And that no associator (non-Muslim subject) shall give any protection to the life and property of a Quraishite, nor shall he come in the way of any believer in this matter.

(21) And if any one intentionally murders a believer, and it is proved, he shall be killed in retaliation, unless the heir of the murdered person be satisfied with blood-money. And all believers shall actually stand for this ordinance and nothing else shall be proper for them to do.

(22) And it shall not be lawful for any one, who has agreed to carry out the provisions laid down in this code and has affixed his faith in God and the Day of Judgment, to give help or protection to any murderer, and if he gives any help or protection to such a person, God‟s curse and wrath shall be on him on the Day of Resurrection, and no money or compensation shall be accepted from such a person.

(23) And that whenever you differ about anything, refer it to God and to Muhammad (صلى الله عليه وسلم)

(24) And the Jews shall share with the believers the expenses of war so long as they fight in conjunction,

(25) And the Jews of Banu ‘Awf shall be considered as one community (Ummat) along with the believers—for the Jews their religion, and for the Muslims theirs, be one client or patron. But whoever does wrong or commits treachery brings evil only on himself and his household.

(26) And the Jews of Banu-an-Najjar shall have the same rights as the Jews of Banu ‘Awf.

(27) And the Jews of Banu-al-Harith shall have the same rights as the Jews of Banu ‘Awf.

(28) And the Jews of Banu Sa‘ida shall have the same rights as the Jews of Banu ‘Awf

(29) And the Jews of Banu Jusham shall have the same rights as the Jews of Banu ‘Awf.

(30) And the Jews of Banu al-Aws shall have the same rights as the Jews of Banu ‘Awf.

(31) And the Jews of Banu Tha‘laba shall have the same rights as the Jews of Banu ‘Awf. But whoever does wrong or commits treachery brings evil only on himself and his household.

(32) And Jafna, who are a branch of the Tha’laba tribe, shall have the same rights as the mother tribes.

(33) And Banu-ash-Shutaiba shall have the same rights as the Jews of Banu ‘Awf; and they shall be faithful to, and not violators of, treaty.

(34) And the mawlas (clients) of Tha'laba shall have the same rights as those of the original members of it.

(35) And the sub-branches of the Jewish tribes shall have the same rights as the mother tribes.

(36) (a) And that none of them shall go out to fight as a soldier of the Muslim army, without the per-mission of Muhammad (صلى الله عليه وسلم). (b) And no obstruction shall be placed in the way of any one‟s retaliation for beating or injuries; and whoever sheds blood  brings it upon himself and his household, except he who has been wronged, and Allah demands the most righteous fulfillment of this [treaty].

(37) (a) And the Jews shall bear the burden of their expenses and the Muslims theirs.

(b) And if any one fights against the people of this code, their (i.e., of the Jews and Muslims) mutual help shall come into operation, and there shall be friendly counsel and sincere behaviour between them; and faithfulness and no breach of covenant.

(38) And the Jews shall be bearing their own expenses so long as they shall be fighting in conjunction with the believers.

(39) And the Valley of Yathrib (Madina) shall be a Haram (sacred place) for the people of this code.

(40) The clients (mawla) shall have the same treatment as the original persons (i.e., persons accepting clientage). He shall neither be harmed nor shall he himself break the covenant.

(41) And no refuge shall be given to any one without the permission of the people of the place (i.e., the refugee shall have no right of giving refuge to others).

(42) And that if any murder or quarrel takes place among the people of this code, from which any trouble may be feared, it shall be referred to God and God‟s Messenger, Muhammad (صلى الله عليه وسلم); and God will be with him who will be most particular about what is written in this code and act on it most faithfully.

(43) The Quraish shall be given no protection nor shall they who help them.

(44) And they (i.e., Jews and Muslims) shall have each other‟s help in the event of any one invading Yathrib.

(45) (a) And if they (i.e., the Jews) are invited to any peace, they also shall offer peace and shall be a party to it; and if they invite the believers to some such affairs, it shall be their (Muslims) duty as well to reciprocate the dealings, excepting that any one makes a religious war. (b) On every group shall rest the responsibility of (repulsing) the enemy from the place which faces its part of the city.

(46) And the Jews of the tribe of al-Aws, clients as well as original members, shall have the same rights as the people of this code: and shall behave sincerely and faithfully towards the latter, not perpetrating any breach of covenant. As one shall sow so shall he reap. And God is with him who will most sincerely and faithfully carry out the provisions of this code.

(47) And this prescript shall not be of any avail to any oppressor or breaker of covenant. And one shall have security whether one goes out to a campaign or remains in Madina, or else it will be an oppression and breach of covenant. And God is the Protector of him who performs the obligations with faithfulness and care, as also His Messenger Muhammad (صلى الله عليه وسلم).

Quraysh
Muhammad's Quraysh (or Quraish) tribe appear in the document as both a principal constituent of the community and the enemy. The Quraysh referred to are sometimes the followers of Muhammad as "migrants" or "believers", but other times, the word refers to those members of the tribe who expelled Muhammad and his followers from Mecca, the Qurayshi capital.

Analysis
Bernard Lewis claims that the charter was not a treaty in the modern sense but a unilateral proclamation by Muhammad. One of the constitution's more interesting aspects was the inclusion of the Jewish tribes in the ummah because although the Jewish tribes were "one community with the believers", they also "have their religion and the Muslims have theirs".

L. Ali Khan says that it was a social contract derived from a treaty and not from any fictional state of nature or from behind the Rawlsian veil of ignorance. It was built upon the concept of one community of diverse tribes living under the sovereignty of one God.

It also instituted peaceful methods of dispute resolution among diverse groups living as one people but without assimilating into one religion, language or culture. Welch in Encyclopedia of Islam states: "The constitution reveals Muhammad's great diplomatic skills, for it allows the ideal that he cherished of an ummah (community) based clearly on a religious outlook to sink temporarily into the background and is shaped essentially by practical considerations."

Tom Holland writes, "The Constitution of Medina is accepted by even the most suspicious of scholars as deriving from the time of Muhammad. Here in these precious documents, it is possible to glimpse the authentic beginnings of a movement that would succeed, in barely two decades, in prostrating both the Roman and the Persian Empires".

Significance of Ummah
Another important feature of the Constitution of Medina is the redefinition of ties between Muslims. It sets faith relationships above blood-ties and emphasizes individual responsibility. Tribal identities are still important to refer to different groups, but the "main binding tie" for the newly created ummah is religion. That contrasts with the norms of pre-Islamic Arabia, which was a thoroughly tribal society, but Serjeant postulates the existence of earlier theocratic communities. According to Denny, "Watt has likened the Ummah as it is described in the document to a tribe, but with the important difference that it was to be based on religion and not on kinship". That is an important event in the development of the small group of Muslims in Medina to the larger Muslim community and empire.

Rights of non-Muslims
The non-Muslims had the following rights on the condition they "follow" the Muslims:
The security of God is equal for all groups.
Non-Muslim members have the same political and cultural rights as Muslims. They have autonomy and freedom of religion.
Non-Muslims take up arms against the enemy of the nation and share the cost of war. There is to be no treachery between the two.
Non-Muslims are not obliged to take part in the Muslims' religious wars.

Reforms

See also 
Al-Risalah al-Huquq
Ashtiname of Muhammad
Islam and secularism
List of expeditions of Muhammad
Marrakesh Declaration
Muhammad in Medina
Ummah

References

Sources

Further reading

 Hamidullah, Muhammad. The First Written Constitution in the World: An Important Document of the Time of the Holy Prophet, 3rd. ed. 1975, Ashraf Press; Lahore, Pakistan.
 Walker, Adam, "Constitution of Medina", in Muhammad in History, Thought, and Culture: An Encyclopedia of the Prophet of God (2 vols.), Edited by C. Fitzpatrick and A. Walker, Santa Barbara, ABC-CLIO, 2014, Vol I, pp. 113–115.
Guillaume, A. The Life of Muhammad: A Translation of Ibn Ishaq's Sirat Rasul Allah. Oxford University Press, 1955. 
Peters, Francis E. Muhammad and the Origins of Islam. State University of New York Press, 1994. 
Donner, Fred M. "Muhammad's Political Consolidation in Arabia up to the Conquest of Mecca". Muslim World 69: 229–47, 1979.
Ben-Zvi, Yitzhak. The Exiled and the Redeemed. Jewish Publication Society, 1957
Yildirim, Yetkin. "Peace and Conflict Resolution in the Medina Charter", Peace Review, Vol. 18, Issue 1, 2006, pp. 109–117.

External links 

Full text with alternate translations
The Constitution of Medina

Treaties of Muhammad
Jewish Saudi Arabian history
Defunct constitutions
Muhammad in Medina
Islam and other religions